Boloceroididae is a family of sea anemones. It has a cosmopolitan distribution in tropical and temperate oceans.

Genera 
The following genera are recognized:

References 

 
Metridioidea
Cnidarian families